Harmonia is the Greek goddess of harmony and concord.

Harmonia may also refer to:

Mythology
 Harmonia (nymph), lover of god Ares and mother of the Amazons

Antiquity
 Harmonia (philosophy), a concept in Pythagoreanism
 Harmonia (Gelo) (3rd. ct.), daughter of Gelo, the son of Hieron II, king of Syracuse

Art
 Harmonia (comics), a DC Comics character based on the Greek goddess
 Harmonia (sculpture), a 1996 outdoor sculpture by Achim Kühn in Turku, Finland
 Harmonia (video game), a 2016 visual novel by Key

Astronomy and geography
 40 Harmonia, an asteroid
 Harmonia, Rio Grande do Sul, Brazil

Biology

 Harmonia (beetle), a genus of lady beetles
 Harmonia (plant), a genus of tarweeds
 Harmonia Tiger-wing, a species of butterfly

Music
 Harmonia (band), a 1970s German band
 Harmonia Ensemble, an Italian chamber music group
 Harmonia Sacra, an 1832 music textbook
 Harmonia, an early music radio show produced by WFIU
 Harmonia, 2005 album by Broken Dog
 Harmonia, 2008 album by Lô Borges
 Harmonia (album), a 2009 album by Akiko Shikata
 "Harmonia", song by ChouCho
 "Harmonia" (song), a 2003 song by Rythem
 "Harmonia", song by Cass McCombs from Catacombs
 composition by Hans-Joachim Roedelius

See also
Wiay, Inner Hebrides

List of shipwrecks in July 1869
 Harmony (disambiguation)